Crown Haven is a medium-sized community on the island of Abaco in The Bahamas. It can be found in the most northwestern part of the island within the North Abaco district.

The population of Crown Haven is 210.(2010 census).

References

Abaco Islands
Populated places in the Bahamas